Sarcodon stereosarcinon is a species of tooth fungus in the family Bankeraceae. Found in North America, it was described as new to science in 1940 by mycologist Lewis Edgar Wehmeyer, who found the original collections in Nova Scotia, Canada.

References

External links
 
 

Fungi described in 1940
Fungi of North America
stereosarcinon